Navagam Ghed is a city and a municipality in Jamnagar district in the Indian state of Gujarat.

Demographics
 India census, Navagam Ghed had a population of 39,483. Males constitute 52% of the population and females 48%. Navagam Ghed has an average literacy rate of 72%, higher than the national average of 59.5%: male literacy is 77%, and female literacy is 67%. In Navagam Ghed, 12% of the population is under 6 years of age.

References

Cities and towns in Jamnagar district